Veit Helmer (born 24 April 1968) is a German film director and screenwriter. He started shooting films at the age of fourteen. After finishing school he was trainee at German TV station NDR. Two month before the wall came down, he moved to East-Berlin to study theatre directing at the famous drama school "Ernst Busch". From 1991 to 1997 Helmer studied film directing at HFF Munich. His first feature film Tuvalu (starring Denis Lavant and Chulpan Khamatova) earned more than 32 awards. His 2008 film Absurdistan was premiered in Sundance and entered into the 30th Moscow International Film Festival.

Selected filmography

References

External links
 

1968 births
Living people
Film people from Hanover
Media Wave Award winners